The Biosciences Federation (BSF) was a United Kingdom body formed in 2002.

Function
The Federation aimed to unite the bioscience community over issues of common interest that related to both research and teaching. These organisations are a key component of the UK's knowledge economy. It also aimed to influence the formulation of UK policy relating to biosciences, and to promote public debate on ethical issues. Its interests were in using knowledge gained in research to benefit society, and the impact of legislation on the life sciences industry.

Events
Each November, it would hold the Life Sciences Careers Conference.

Structure
During October 2009, the Biosciences Federation was merged with the Institute of Biology (IoB) to form the Society of Biology (which boasts some 80,000 members).

The last president of the Federation was Dame Nancy Rothwell (2006–9); Richard Dyer, former director of the Babraham Institute, was the chief executive officer (2006–9). Sir Tom Blundell was a former president (2004–6).

Affiliated organisations in the federation
From 2007, the Biosciences Federation encompassed 51 member or associated organisations that covered the entire range of life sciences; these included 
 Association of the British Pharmaceutical Industry
 Association for the Study of Animal Behaviour
 AstraZeneca
 Biochemical Society
 British Andrology Society
 British Association for Psychopharmacology
 British Ecological Society
 British Neuroscience Association
 British Pharmacological Society
 British Society of Animal Science
 British Society for Cell Biology
 British Society for Developmental Biology
 British Society for Immunology
 British Society for Neuroendocrinology
 British Society for Proteome Research
 British Society for Medical Mycology
 British Toxicological Society
 Experimental Psychology Society
 Genetics Society
 Institute of Animal Technology
 Institute of Biology
 Institute of Horticulture
 Laboratory Animal Science Association
 Linnean Society
 Nutrition Society
 Physiological Society
 Royal Microscopical Society
 Society for Endocrinology
 Society for Applied Microbiology
 Society for Experimental Biology
 Society for General Microbiology
 UK Environmental Mutagen Society
 Zoological Society of London

Activities
The Federation responded to government consultations on biology-related issues; these responses were published on the Federation's website. It also distributed science policy news to a range of organisations that included universities, research councils, pharmaceutical companies and government bodies. The Federation hosted several life sciences careers conferences and symposia on issues such as open access publishing. It also supported the annual award for scientific communication.

References

External links
 Society of Biology homepage

Biology organisations based in the United Kingdom
Life sciences industry
Organisations based in Cambridge
Organizations established in 2002
Organizations disestablished in 2009
Professional associations based in the United Kingdom
2002 establishments in the United Kingdom